Help Me Make It Through the Night is the debut studio album released by American country artist Sammi Smith. The album was originally released in September 1970 on Mega Records and was produced by Jim Malloy. The album was originally named He's Everywhere but was renamed Help Me Make It Through the Night due to the popularity of that track, which reached number one on the Billboard country music chart and the Top 10 on the Billboard Hot 100 chart. The album comprised Smith's first recordings for the Mega label.

Background and content 
Help Me Make It Through the Night was recorded in May 1970 at the Monument Records recording studio in Nashville, Tennessee, United States and included Smith's first recordings for Mega Records, after leaving the Columbia label in 1969. The album's style reflected the Outlaw Country sound, which was found in other artists such as Willie Nelson and Waylon Jennings. The album was originally titled He's Everywhere, due to the single of the same name becoming Smith's first Top 40 hit on the Billboard country chart. When the title track became a major hit, the album was retitled with the same album number. The album consisted of eleven tracks of new material. The release included a series of cover versions, such as Patsy Cline's "There He Goes", The First Edition's "But You Know I Love You", and Johnny Darrell's "With Pen in Hand". Two songs composed by Kris Kristofferson were also included: the Help Me Make It Through the Night and Johnny Cash's "Sunday Mornin' Comin' Down". The debut record also contained five new tracks ("Saunder's Ferry Lane", "He's Everywhere", "Don't Blow No Smoke on Me", "When Michael Calls", and "This Room for Rent").

The album was originally released on an LP record, with six songs on the first side of the record and five on the opposite side. The album has never been reissued on compact disc.

Release 
The lead single released from Smith's future album was the album's sixth track entitled "He's Everywhere" in July 1970. The single became Smith's first Top 40 and Top 30 single, reaching #25 on the Billboard Country music chart that year. In November 1970, "Help Me Make It Through the Night" was released and became Smith's biggest hit and signature song. It reached #1 on the Billboard Magazine Hot Country Singles chart, #8 on the Billboard Hot 100, and #3 on the Billboard Hot Adult Contemporary Tracks chart in 1971. In addition, "Help Me Make It Through the Night" also reached #1 on the RPM Country chart in Canada, as well as #4 on its Top Singles chart.<ref name="rpm">{{cite magazine|url=http://www.collectionscanada.gc.ca/rpm/028020-110.01-e.php?PHPSESSID=gmrhouli7kvfvaeu848ka389j0&q1=Help+Me+Make+It+Through+the+Night&q2=&interval=20|title=Search results for "Help Me Make It Through the Night |magazine=RPM|accessdate=27 March 2010}}</ref> For the song's success, Smith would later win the Country Music Association's "Single of the Year" award and the Grammy Award for Best Female Country Vocal Performance in 1972. The album was released in September 1970 on Mega Records and peaked at #1 on the Billboard Magazine Top Country Albums chart and #33 on the Billboard 200 albums list. It also went to #51 on the RPM'' Top Albums chart in Canada, Smith's only album to chart there.

Track listing 
Side one
"Saunder's Ferry Lane" – (Janette Tooley, Jean Whitehead) 3:08
"There He Goes" – (Durwood Haddock, Eddie Miller, W.S. Stevenson) 3:23
"With Pen in Hand" – (Bobby Goldsboro) 3:50
"Sunday Mornin' Comin' Down" – (Kris Kristofferson) 4:37
"Lonely Street" – (Carl Belew, Kenny Sowder, Stevenson) 2:46
"He's Everywhere" – (Gene Dobbins, Whitehead) 3:04

Side two
"Help Me Make It Through the Night" – (Kristofferson) 2:32
"But You Know I Love You" – (Mike Settle) 2:42
"Don't Blow No Smoke on Me" – (Dobbins, Whitehead) 2:03
"When Michael Calls" – (Tooley) 2:20
"This Room for Rent" – (Tooley) 2:54

Personnel 
 Byron Bach – strings
 Brenton Banks – strings
 George Binkley – strings
 David Briggs – piano
 Jerry Carrigan – drums
 Marvin Chantry – strings
 Albert Coleman – strings
 John Darnall – strings
 Lillian Hunt – strings
 Roy Huskey – bass
 Martin Katahn – strings
 Sheldon Kurland – strings
 Martha McCrory – strings
 Farrell Morris – percussion
 Weldon Myrick – steel guitar
 Bill Pursell – piano
 Billy Sanford – guitar
 Jerry Shook – guitar
 Sammi Smith – lead vocals
 David Vanderkool – strings
 Gary Vanosdale – strings
 Bill Walker – vibes
 Stephanie Woolf – strings
 Chip Young - guitar

Sales chart positions 
Album

Singles

References 

1970 debut albums
Sammi Smith albums
Mega Records albums